Alexandre 'Alex' Miguel Barros Soares (born 1 March 1991) is a Portuguese professional footballer who plays as a midfielder.

Club career
Born in Lisbon, Soares played youth football with four local clubs, including S.L. Benfica from ages 9 to 16. He made his senior debut with C.F. Esperança de Lagos, in the fourth division.

In January 2012, after a very brief spell in Greece with Panserraikos FC, Soares returned to his country, joining C.S. Marítimo and being assigned to the reserves in the third tier. Two years later, manager Pedro Martins promoted him to the first team.

Soares made his Primeira Liga debut on 18 August 2013, starting and being booked in a 2–1 home win against former team Benfica. He scored his first goal in the competition on 24 November of that year, helping the hosts defeat Gil Vicente F.C. 3–2.

On 3 July 2017, after an average of 23 league appearances at the Estádio do Marítimo, Soares moved abroad again and signed a two-year contract with Cypriot First Division club AC Omonia. He made his debut on 10 September in the season opener, a 2–1 home win against Ethnikos Achna FC, and scored his first goal ten days later with a chip in a 5–2 victory over AEK Larnaca FC.

Soares returned to Portugal and its top flight in the summer of 2019, agreeing to a two-year deal at Moreirense FC.

Personal life
Soares' younger brother, Filipe, is also a footballer and a midfielder.

References

External links

1991 births
Living people
Portuguese footballers
Footballers from Lisbon
Association football midfielders
Primeira Liga players
Liga Portugal 2 players
Segunda Divisão players
C.S. Marítimo players
Moreirense F.C. players
Super League Greece players
Panserraikos F.C. players
Volos N.F.C. players
Cypriot First Division players
AC Omonia players
Portuguese expatriate footballers
Expatriate footballers in Greece
Expatriate footballers in Cyprus
Portuguese expatriate sportspeople in Greece
Portuguese expatriate sportspeople in Cyprus